New York City's 12th City Council district is one of 51 districts in the New York City Council. It has been represented by Democrat Kevin Riley since a 2020 special election to replace disgraced fellow Democrat Andy King.

Geography
District 12 covers the farthest northeastern neighborhoods of the Bronx, including all of Williamsbridge, Baychester, Co-op City, and Eastchester as well as part of Wakefield.

The district overlaps with Bronx Community Boards 10, 11, and 12, and is contained almost entirely within New York's 16th congressional district, with a small extension into the 14th district. It also overlaps with the 34th and 36th districts of the New York State Senate, and with the 80th, 81st, 82nd, and 83rd districts of the New York State Assembly.

With its population base in heavily-Black neighborhoods like Williamsbridge and Baychester, District 12 is the only majority-Black City Council district in the Bronx.

Recent election results

2021
In 2019, voters in New York City approved Ballot Question 1, which implemented ranked-choice voting in all local elections. Under the new system, voters have the option to rank up to five candidates for every local office. Voters whose first-choice candidates fare poorly will have their votes redistributed to other candidates in their ranking until one candidate surpasses the 50 percent threshold. If one candidate surpasses 50 percent in first-choice votes, then ranked-choice tabulations will not occur.

2020 special
In October 2020, Andy King was expelled from the City Council for harassment, discrimination, and conflict of interest, triggering a special election for his seat. Like all municipal special elections in New York City, the race was officially nonpartisan, with all candidates running on ballot lines of their own creation.

2017

2013

References

New York City Council districts